Harry Jackson may refer to:

Harry R. Jackson Jr., African-American pastor
Harry Jackson (cinematographer) (1896–1953), American cinematographer
Harry Jackson (criminal) (1861–?), first man to be convicted in the United Kingdom using fingerprint evidence
Harry Jackson (cyclist) (born 1941), English Olympic cyclist
Harry Jackson (footballer, born 1864) (1864–1899), English footballer for Notts County
Harry Jackson (footballer, born 1918) (1918–1984), footballer for Chester City
Harry Jackson (politician) (1876–1951), member of the South Australian House of Assembly
Harry Jackson (artist) (1924–2011), painter famous for both abstract works and Western scenes
Harry C. Jackson (1915–2000), American politician, mayor of Columbus, Georgia
Harry Jackson (MacGyver), a fictional character portrayed by John Anderson in the MacGyver television series
Harry Jackson, major character in the soap opera The Bold and the Beautiful

See also
Harold Jackson (disambiguation)
Henry Jackson (disambiguation)